Sexred, or Sexræd (d. 626?), was a king of the East Saxons.

Sexred was the son of Sæberht (d. 616?) the first Christian king of the East Saxons, whom he succeeded, reigning jointly with his two brothers, Saeward and another, said on no good authority to have been named Sigebert (Bromton, ap. Decem SS. col. 743) but perhaps the unplaced Seaxbald, father of Swithhelm. Sexred refused to accept Christianity, openly practised paganism and gave permission to his subjects to worship their idols.

When he and his brothers saw Mellitus (d. 624), bishop of London, giving the eucharist to the people in church, it was commonly believed in the Venerable Bede's time that they said to him, "Why do you not offer us the white bread that you used to give to our father Saba, for so they called him, and which you still give to the people?" Mellitus answered that if they would be washed in the font they should have it, but that otherwise it would do them no good. But they said that they would not enter the font, for they did not need washing but refreshment. The matter was often explained to them by the bishop, who persisted in refusing their request. At last they grew angry and banished him from their kingdom. Not long afterwards they went out to fight with the West Saxons, and were slain, their army being almost wholly destroyed (Bede, Hist. Eccl. ii. c. 5). This battle was fought against Cynegils and Cwichelm of Wessex, the West Saxon kings who invaded their territory with a larger force than the East Saxons could muster in or about 626. They were succeeded by Sigeberht the Little.

In popular culture 
The first series of BBC Four comedy Detectorists follows a group of characters searching for Sexred's lost burial place, in the hope of uncovering a Saxon hoard.

References 

Attribution

Year of birth unknown
626 deaths
East Saxon monarchs
Anglo-Saxon warriors
Anglo-Saxons killed in battle
7th-century English monarchs
Anglo-Saxon pagans
Monarchs killed in action